Tom Wellington (22 August 1921 – 16 March 1998) was an Australian rules footballer who played with Hawthorn in the Victorian Football League (VFL).

He was selected to play in the final round of the 1938 season, but withdrew due to illness and didn't make his senior debut until the following year.

Notes

External links 

1921 births
1998 deaths
Australian rules footballers from Victoria (Australia)
Hawthorn Football Club players